The Alexandrovsk uezd was one of the subdivisions of the Yekaterinoslav Governorate of the Russian Empire. It was situated in the southern part of the governorate. Its administrative centre was Alexandrovsk (present-day Zaporizhia).

Demographics
At the time of the Russian Empire Census of 1897, Alexandrovsky Uyezd had a population of 271,678. Of these, 82.5% spoke Ukrainian, 5.7% Russian, 5.2% German, 5.1% Yiddish, 1.2% Belarusian, 0.1% Polish and 0.1% Romani as their native language.

References

 
Uyezds of Yekaterinoslav Governorate
Yekaterinoslav Governorate